Qurbaani is a 1999 Maldivian comedy drama film directed by Amjad Ibrahim. Produced by Moosa Rushdi under Kathiriyaa Productions, the film stars Yoosuf Shafeeu, Mariyam Nisha and Hussain Sobah in pivotal roles.

Cast 
 Yoosuf Shafeeu as Shiyam
 Mariyam Nisha as Mariyam Nisha
 Hussain Sobah as Hussain Sobah
 Sithi Fulhu as Khadheeja
 Neena Saleem (Special appearance in the song "Handhaaneh Aavee Ey")

Soundtrack

See also
 Lists of Maldivian films

References

Maldivian comedy-drama films

Films directed by Amjad Ibrahim
1999 comedy-drama films
Dhivehi-language films